Paul Avgerinos (born November 21, 1957 in Norwalk, Connecticut) is an American music composer, performer, and producer. His work is in the genres of ambient, space, world, World Fusion, electronic, and drone. Avgerinos has worked with Deana Carter and The Celtic Tenors. Avgerinos is a member of ASCAP and his music has been used in motion pictures, television shows, and commercials.

Career
Avgerinos graduated from The Peabody Conservatory of Johns Hopkins University in 1981. He served as Principal Bass in orchestras and has toured with Charles Aznavour and Buddy Rich.

Avgerinos' work uses a combination of acoustic and electronic instruments. Avgerinos plays bass violin, cello, guitars, and keyboards. Avgerinos often uses Romantic and Impressionistic techniques as he composes and arranges his New Age productions. Often employing wordless choirs, he sometimes uses lyrics as in his album of Sacred Chant, Phos Hilaron, and his album GNOSIS, which utilizes Greek Orthodox Chanting. Garden of Delight won awards for Best World Album of the Year and CD of the Month on Echoes.

Collaboration with Peter Kater on his Red Moon album yielded a final five Grammy Nomination in 2004.

Avgerinos currently resides in Redding, CT.

In 2005, Avgerinos received best cover art from the Zone Music Reporter for his album Maya. His album Gnosis won best relaxation album, and Garden of Delight won best World Album respectively. Bliss was announced as the best Relaxation Album in 2011 and Lovers was the best New Age album in 2012. His major awards came in 2015 and 2016, when Avgerinos received his first Grammy nomination for Bhakti. In 2016 he won his first Grammy award for Best New Age Album for the release of Grace.

Awards
 Maya - 2005 NAR Lifestyle Music Award Best Cover Art
 Gnosis - 2006 NAR Lifestyle Music Award Best Relaxation/Meditation Album
 Garden of Delight- 2007 NAR Lifestyle Music Award Best World Album
 Bliss- 2011 Zone Music Reporter Best Relaxation/Meditation Album
 Bhakti - 2015 Grammy Nomination for Best New Age Album
 Grace - 2016 Grammy Winner for Best New Age Album
Puertos - 2020 Latin Grammy Winner, Producer of Best Jazz Album

Discography

Albums
 2021 PEACE https://roundskymusic.com/peace-by-paul-avgerinos/ 
2021 Spiritual Warrior Workout w/ Deepak Chopra & Kabir Sehgal https://roundskymusic.com/spiritual-warrior-workout-deepak-chopra/  
2020 HEALING  http://roundskymusic.com/healing/ 
 2020 Gratitude Joy 2  http://roundskymusic.com/gratitude-joy-2-2/ 
 2020 Spiritual Warrior with Deepak Chopra & Kabir Sehgal 
 2019 DEVOTION with Krishna Das, Jai Uttal, Donna De Lory and Wah!
 2019 Musical Meditations on The Seven Spiritual Laws of Success, with Deepak Chopra & Kabir Sehgal
 2018 Mindfulness
2017 Home: Where Everyone Is Welcome - By Deepak Chopra, Kabir Sehgal & Paul Avgerinos published by Hachette, NYC 
 2016 Amma - Devotional Songs to the Divine Mother on Round Sky Music
 2015 GRACE on Round Sky Music
 2014 BHAKTI on Round Sky Music
 2013 RELAX on Round Sky Music
 2013 MEDITATE on Round Sky Music
 2012 LOVERS on Round Sky Music
 2011 BLISS on Round Sky Music
 2010 Law of Attraction on Round Sky Music
 2009 LOVE on Round Sky Music
 2008 Garden of Delight on Real Music
 2007 Gratitude Joy on Real Music
 2006 GNOSIS on Round Sky Music
 2005 MAYA on Round Sky Music
 2005 Phos Hilaron on Round Sky Music
 2001 Words Touch on Round Sky Music
 1998 Sky of Grace on Round Sky Music
 1992 Muse of the Round Sky on Hearts of Space
 1988 Maya ; The Great Katun on World Room
 1987 Balancing Spheres on World Room
 1987 Sensual Storm on New World
 1986 Tropical Paradise on New World
 1986 Island Sanctuary on New World
 1985 Celestial Voyage on New World

Samplers and collections
 2008 iRelax with Numi Tea, Real Music
 2008 Finding Balance, Sacred Spa Series, Real Music
 2005 Relaxation Spa - The Greek Isles
 2005 Relaxation Spa - The Yucatán
 2005 Relaxation Spa - The Lost Nexis
 2002 Oasis Spa Series, SIX Albums
 1994 MBNT, Hearts of Space
 1993 The Absolute Sound, Hearts of Space
 1994 Omni; Deep Space Vol. 4
 1992 Universe Sampler, Hearts of Space
 1992 Adventures in Music, New Age 5

References

External links

Official website

American male composers
21st-century American composers
American new-age musicians
American people of Greek descent
New-age musicians
Ambient musicians
1957 births
Living people
Musicians from Norwalk, Connecticut
Record producers from Connecticut
Johns Hopkins University alumni
Grammy Award winners
People from Redding, Connecticut
21st-century American male musicians